The 1934 Minnesota lieutenant gubernatorial election took place on November 6, 1934. Minnesota Farmer–Labor Party candidate Hjalmar Petersen defeated Republican Party of Minnesota challenger Franklin F. Ellsworth and Minnesota Democratic Party candidate Arthur D. Reynolds.

Results

Lieutenant Gubernatorial
1934

Minnesota